Jekaterina Duman (born Zaidentsal; born 28 October 1983) is an Estonian middle-distance runner.

She was born in Tallinn. In 2008 she graduated from University of Tartu's Institute of Physical Education.

She began athletics training in 1998, coached by Aleksander Tšikin. 1999-2008 her coach was Ivan Kovaljov. She competed at the 2007 Summer Universiade. She is multiple-times Estonian champion in different running disciplines. 2002–2007 she was a member of Estonian national athletics team.

Personal best:
 400 m: 54,88 (2007)
 800 m: 2.06,50 (2007)

References

Living people
1983 births
Estonian female sprinters
Estonian female middle-distance runners
University of Tartu alumni
Athletes from Tallinn
Competitors at the 2007 Summer Universiade